Gottlob Alexander Sauerweid (19 February 1783, Kurland - 25 October 1844, Saint Petersburg) was a Baltic German painter who taught battle painting at the St. Petersburg Imperial Academy of Arts.

Biography 
In 1795, when Kurland was annexed by Russia, his family moved to Germany where he received his artistic training at the Dresden Academy of Fine Arts from 1806 to 1812. As a young man, he enjoyed some popularity and produced a series of horse portraits, commissioned by Napoleon. He later went to Paris, travelling most of the way on foot for lack of funds, then to London, where his talent for painting battle scenes was recognized. In 1814, Czar Alexander I invited him to Saint Petersburg to paint official portraits of Russian troops and their uniforms. In 1825, he became the first Painter of the General Staff.

In 1827, he was named an honorary member of the Imperial Academy and soon became head of the battle painting class. Later he was elevated to full Professor. Under Czar Nicholas I, he was Art Instructor for the Grand Dukes Konstantin, Nicholas and Michael. 

Most of his paintings were displayed in the Imperial Palaces, rather than in exhibitions. The majority are still there. His sense of perspective has been criticized, but his horses are considered to be particularly well done. In addition to oil paintings, he left behind many watercolors, etchings and drawings in pen. His son Nikolay also became a painter of military scenes.

Works

References

Further reading/sources 
 Thomas Hemmann: Der Krieg in Sachsen 1809 dargestellt von Geißler und Sauerweid. BoD (2011) 
In the original Russian, this article incorporates material from the Brockhaus and Efron Encyclopedic Dictionary (1890-1907)

External links

 Художники и Время: Biographies of Alexander and his son Nikolay
 Historischer Bilderdienst: Search results for "Sauerweid" (links to several pages of uniform portraits)
 Napoleon Series: The Westphalian Army in 1810 by Sauerweid

1783 births
1844 deaths
Painters from the Russian Empire
Military art
People from Courland Governorate
Baltic-German people
People from the Duchy of Courland and Semigallia
German emigrants to the Russian Empire